Jane Marion Hunt (born 4 June 1966) is a British Conservative Party politician who served as Parliamentary Under-Secretary of State for Small Business, Consumers and Labour Markets from July to September 2022. She has served as Member of Parliament (MP) for Loughborough in Leicestershire since 2019.

Career 
Hunt served on Charnwood Borough Council from 2003 until 2015 for Loughborough Nanpantan, and from 2018 for Quorn and Mountsorrel Castle. She worked as an adviser to her predecessor, Nicky Morgan, in Morgan's role as MP for Loughborough from 2010 to 2019. She was the unsuccessful Conservative prospective parliamentary candidate for several safe Labour seats prior to 2019, initially contesting Leicester East at the 2010 general election and the neighbouring Leicester South at the 2011 by-election. She also unsuccessfully contested Nottingham South at the 2015 and 2017 general elections. Hunt finished second in all bar one of the contests, coming third in Leicester South behind the Liberal Democrats.

Hunt was elected at the 2019 general election; it was her fourth attempt to enter Parliament. She made her maiden speech to the House of Commons on 20 January 2020. She was appointed Parliamentary Private Secretary to the Cabinet Office. On 8 July 2022 she was appointed Parliamentary Under-Secretary of State for Small Business, Consumers and Labour Markets.

In October 2022, following the resignation of Liz Truss as Prime Minister, Hunt announced that she would be supporting previous Prime Minister Boris Johnson in the subsequent leadership election.

Personal life
Hunt is married and has two children.

References

External links

1966 births
Living people
People from Quorn, Leicestershire
People from the Borough of Charnwood
Councillors in Leicestershire
Conservative Party (UK) councillors
Conservative Party (UK) MPs for English constituencies
Members of the Parliament of the United Kingdom for Loughborough
Female members of the Parliament of the United Kingdom for English constituencies
UK MPs 2019–present
21st-century British women politicians
21st-century English women
21st-century English people
Women councillors in England
Women government ministers in the United Kingdom